Stuck Apart is a 2021 Turkish comedy-drama film directed by Durul Taylan and Yağmur Taylan, written by Durul Taylan, Yagmur Taylan and Berkun Oya and starring Engin Günaydın, Haluk Bilginer and Binnur Kaya. The film was originally scheduled to be released theatrically by Imaj International on October 2, 2020. The theatrical release was later cancelled due to the COVID-19 pandemic and it was sold to Netflix. It was released on 8 January 2021 on Netflix.

Cast 
 Engin Günaydın - Aziz
 Haluk Bilginer - Erbil
 Binnur Kaya - Kamuran
 Öner Erkan - Alp
 İrem Sak - Burcu
 Fatih Artman - Cevdet
 Gülçin Santırcıoğlu - Vildan
 İlker Aksum - Rıza
 Hülya Duyar - Rüya
 Göktuğ Yıldırım - Caner
 Helin Kandemir - Cansu
 Bergüzar Korel - Füsun
 Halit Ergenç - Necati
 Okan Yalabık - psychologist

References

External links 

 
 

2021 films
Turkish comedy-drama films
Tragicomedy films
2020s Turkish-language films
Turkish-language Netflix original films
2021 comedy-drama films
Films not released in theaters due to the COVID-19 pandemic